Trondhjem Norwegian Lutheran Church is a historic church in Webster Township, Rice County, Minnesota. It was original built in 1878 and rebuilt in 1899.

History
According to the congregation minutes, on May 15, 1876, Norwegian immigrants established the Throndhjem's (sic) Church. The name was inspired by the historic city of Trondheim and the province of Trondelag.  The original church was erected on the same site during 1878. The chancel in the current building dates to that original church. Trondhjem is an architectural mix of Greek Revival and Gothic Revival styles, which also incorporates elements of the stave churches of Norway.  The original church built in 1878 used a cruciform architectural plan.  All but the chancel was taken down in 1899 to allow a larger building to be erected on site, with the original chancel incorporated into the new building and many elements in this building showing signs of prior use; most likely re-used from the prior structure.

Present status
In 1988 the Trondhjem Lutheran Congregation moved out of this historic building into a new church located a half mile away. The old church building has been restored by the Trondhjem Community Preservation Society, Inc. Annually the society hosts a winter concert, an ice cream social in July and the Syttende Mai celebration, all part of fundraising efforts.

The restoration project of the old church building was completed during 2002. The interior of the 1899 church had originally been decorated with hand painted and stenciled Casein paint on a decorative motif. The original murals were uncovered under layers of embossed tin, paint and wallpaper. The murals were restored in the restoration and where necessary were replicated in areas where the original art work was missing.

In 2001 Trondhjem Norwegian Lutheran Church was listed on the National Register of Historic Places by the United States Department of Interior, United States Park Service, because of its historical significance. Also listed on the National Register of Historic Places and located across the road from the Old Trondhjem Church is the cemetery which was established before the church building.

References

Related reading
Ronning, N. N. (1947) Pioneer Sketches from Webster, Rice County, Minnesota (Minneapolis: Ludvig Broten)
Rice County Historical Society  (1987) Portraits and Memories of Rice County, Minnesota (Dallas: Taylor Publishing Co.)

External links

Trondhjem Lutherna Church website
Trondhjem Norwegian Lutheran Church and Cemetery
Trondhjem Preservation tour
Trondhjem Community Preservation Society webxite

19th-century Lutheran churches in the United States
Churches completed in 1899
Churches in Rice County, Minnesota
Lutheran churches in Minnesota
19th-century Lutheran churches
Norwegian-American culture in Minnesota
Churches on the National Register of Historic Places in Minnesota
National Register of Historic Places in Rice County, Minnesota